Rachel Verinder is a character in Wilkie Collins' 1868 novel The Moonstone. Despite being the heroine, the story is never related from her viewpoint, as it is in turn from the other main protagonists, leaving her character always seen from the outside.

Character
A somewhat spoilt and self-reliant girl, Rachel is in love with her cousin Frankin Blake. P. D. James saw her as one of the examples of Collins' rare (Victorian) ability to depict women capable of real desire: With her temper, insistence on making her own decisions, and readiness to grapple with the social implications of her passion for a man she thinks of as a thief, Rachel has been seen as a prototype of the New Woman, as anticipated in the sensation novel.

Media treatments

The Moonstone has often been portrayed in film.
In the 1934 adaption, Phyllis Barry appears as Rachel (or Ann Verinder, as she was therein called).

See also
Paula Powers
Protofeminism

References

Literary characters introduced in 1868
Fictional English people